Saphenamycin is an antibiotic with the molecular formula C23H18N2O5 which is produced by the bacterium Streptomyces canarius and other Streptomyces species.

References 

Antibiotics
Phenazines
Esters
Benzoic acids
Salicylic acids